Pico de gallo, also called salsa fresca ('fresh sauce'), salsa bandera ('flag sauce'), and salsa cruda ('raw sauce'), is a type of salsa commonly used in Mexican cuisine. It is traditionally made from chopped tomato, onion, and serrano peppers (jalapeños or habaneros may be used as alternatives), with salt, lime juice, and cilantro.

Pico de gallo can be used in much the same way as other Mexican liquid salsas. Because it contains less liquid, it also can be used as a main ingredient in dishes such as tacos and fajitas.

The tomato-based variety is widely known as salsa picada ('minced/chopped sauce'). In Mexico it is normally called salsa mexicana ('Mexican sauce'). Because the colours of the red tomato, white onion, and green chili and cilantro are reminiscent of the colours of the Mexican flag, it is also called salsa bandera ('flag sauce').

In many regions of Mexico the term pico de gallo describes any of a variety of salads (including fruit salads), salsa, or fillings made with tomato, tomatillo, avocado, orange, jícama, cucumber, papaya, or mild chilis. The ingredients are tossed in lime juice and optionally with either hot sauce or chamoy, then sprinkled with a salty chili powder.

Etymology
According to food writer Sharon Tyler Herbst, pico de gallo ("rooster's beak") is named thus because originally people ate it by pinching pieces between the thumb and forefinger.

In their book Authentic Mexican: Regional Cooking from the Heart of Mexico, Rick Bayless and Deann Groen speculate that the name might allude to the bird feed–like texture and appearance of the mince.

Many native residents of the Sonoran Mexico region explain that the salsa is thus named because the serrano pepper resembles a rooster's beak in shape.

The Spanish picar means "to chop" or "to bite" (in the sense of a spicy chili having a "bite"); in the first person conjugation, picar becomes pico.

See also

 Dabu-dabu
 Kachumber
 List of Mexican dishes
 List of tomato dishes
 Pebre
 Salad
 Shirazi salad
 Vinagrete
 Xnipec

References

External links
 

Condiments
Cuisine of the Southwestern United States
Mexican cuisine
Mexican garnish
New Mexican cuisine
Salads
Spanish words and phrases
Tex-Mex cuisine
Tomato dishes
Vegetable dishes
Vegan cuisine